František Nedvěd (27 October 1950 – 27 February 2010) was a Czech weightlifter. He competed in the men's featherweight event at the 1980 Summer Olympics.

References

External links
 

1950 births
2010 deaths
Czech male weightlifters
Olympic weightlifters of Czechoslovakia
Weightlifters at the 1980 Summer Olympics
People from Cheb District
Sportspeople from the Karlovy Vary Region